Detroit Township is located in Pike County, Illinois. As of the 2010 census, its population was 312 and it contained 163 housing units.

History
Detroit Township is named after Detroit, Michigan.

Geography

Demographics

References

External links
City-data.com
Illinois State Archives

Townships in Pike County, Illinois
Townships in Illinois